Alafia lucida is a plant in the family Apocynaceae.

Description
Its fragrant flowers feature a yellow or cream corolla, dark red at the throat.

Distribution and habitat
Alafia lucida is native to an area of tropical Africa from Liberia east to Tanzania. Its habitat is forests, from sea level to  altitude.

Uses
Local traditional medicinal uses of Alafia lucida include as a treatment for jaundice, eye problems and stomach complaints. The plant has been used as arrow poison.

References

lucida
Plants described in 1894
Plants used in traditional African medicine
Flora of Africa